Denmark has more than  of railway lines, of which most are under the control of Banedanmark; a number of private railways run their own lines.

Banedanmark lines 
 Copenhagen–Fredericia/Taulov
 Copenhagen-Ringsted
 Ringsted–Rødby Færge (Sydbanen, part of Fugleflugtslinien)
 Nykøbing F–Gedser (Gedserbanen)
 Roskilde–Køge–Næstved (Lille Syd)
 Roskilde–Kalundborg (Nordvestbanen)
 Lersøen–Østerport
 The S-train network
 Copenhagen–Helsingør (Kystbanen)
 Copenhagen/Vigerslev–Peberholm (Øresundsbanen)
 Odense–Svendborg (Svendborgbanen)
 Fredericia–Århus
 Århus–Aalborg
 Aalborg–Frederikshavn (Vendsysselbanen)
 Lindholm–Aalborg Airport (Lufthavnsbanen)
 Fredericia–Padborg
 Sønderborg–Tinglev (Sønderborgbanen)
 Lunderskov–Esbjerg
 Bramming–Tønder
 Esbjerg–Struer
 Langå–Struer
 Vejle–Holstebro
 Struer–Thisted (Thistedbanen)
 Skanderborg–Skjern
 Århus–Grenå (Grenåbanen)

Under construction/planned
 Billund railway line (planned)
 Hovedgård-Hasselager (planned)
 Ringsted-Femern ( of new track under construction)

Other 
In addition to Banedanmark's network,  of railway are under the control of various other companies:

Local lines around the capital 
 Elsinore–Gilleleje (Hornbækbanen)
 Hillerød–Tisvildeleje (Gribskovbanen)
 Kagerup–Gilleleje (Gribskovbanen)
 Hillerød–Hundested (Frederiksværkbanen)
 Hillerød–Snekkersten (Lille Nord)
 Jægersborg–Nærum (Nærumbanen)
 Køge–Fakse Ladeplads (Østbanen)
 Hårlev–Rødvig (Østbanen)

Regional trains 
 Holbæk–Nykøbing Sjælland (Odsherredbanen)
 Tølløse–Slagelse (Tølløsebanen)
 Nykøbing Falster–Nakskov (Lollandsbanen)

Vestbanen 
 Varde–Nørre Nebel

Railways of central Jutland 
 Århus–Odder (Odderbanen)
 Vemb–Thyborøn (Lemvigbanen)

Railways of northern Jutland 
 Frederikshavn–Skagen (Skagensbanen)
 Hjørring–Hirtshals (Hirtshalsbanen)

Metroselskabet (Copenhagen Metro) 
 Vanløse–Vestamager
 Christianshavn–Lufthavnen

Closed railway lines
 Allingebanen
 Assensbanen
 Gudhjembanen
 Nexøbanen

See also 
 Rail transport in Denmark
 :Category:Railway lines in Denmark

References

External links 
 Line information (TIB) from Banedanmark
 Line information (LA) from Banedanmark

Denmark

Railway lines